Happiness is a studio album by American country music artist Margo Smith. It was released in April 1977 via Warner Bros. Records and was produced by Norro Wilson. The album contained ten tracks that mixed country and pop arrangements, according to one critic. Four singles were released off the record, including the major hits "Take My Breath Away" and "Love's Explosion." The album itself also reached charting positions following its release.

Background and content
Margo Smith had her first success on with the top ten hit "There I Said It," which was issued on 20th Century Fox Records. The label folded in 1975 and Smith signed with Warner Bros. Records the following year. She soon had another top ten hit with a cover of "Save Your Kisses for Me." Like her previous album effort, Smith worked under the production of Norro Wilson, who produced Happiness between March 1976 and February 1977. All sessions took place at the Columbia Recording Studio, located in Nashville, Tennessee. Happiness consisted of country and pop music songs, according to Jim Worbois of Allmusic. Of its country songs was a cover of "Lovesick Blues." Of its pop songs was a cover of "My Happiness," which was made successful by Connie Francis. Four tracks were self-penned by Smith herself. Of these self-penned songs was "So Close Again," which was a duet with Norro Wilson (who also co-wrote the track).

Release and reception
Happiness was released in April 1977 on Warner Bros. Records. With its release, Happiness became the fourth studio project in Smith's music career. The album was distributed as a vinyl LP and a cassette, containing five songs on each side. Happiness reached number 41 on the Billboard Top Country Albums chart, becoming her third album to reach a position here. The project also included four singles released between 1976 and 1977. The first was "Take My Breath Away," which was issued in September 1976 and peaked at number seven on the Billboard Hot Country Songs chart. "Love's Explosion" was released as the second single from the album in January 1977, peaking at number 12. It was followed in May 1977 by "My Weakness," which reached number 23 on the same chart. Its final single release was "So Close Again," which only peaked at number 43 on the Billboard country list. Happiness was give three stars by Jim Worbois of Allmusic, who praised its variety of country and pop songs. However, he also found that some cover songs do not fit, such as "My Happiness."

Track listings

Vinyl version

Cassette version

Personnel
All credits are adapted from the liner notes of Happiness.

Musical personnel

 Curt Allen – Rhythm guitar
 Tommy Allsup – Tic tac bass
 Kenny Buttrey – Drums
 Jerry Carrigan – Drums
 Pete Drake – Dobro, steel guitar
 Janie Fricke – Background vocals
 Rudi Gatlin – Background vocals
 Steve Gatlin – Background vocals
 Steve Gibson – Rhythm guitar
 Tommy Jackson – Fiddle
 Sheri Kramer – Background vocals
 Bob Moore – Bass
 Hargus "Pig" Robbins – Piano
 Billy Sanford – Guitar
 Margo Smith – Lead vocals
 The Sound Seventy Singers – Background vocals
 Pete Wade – Rhythm guitar
 Bobby Wood – Piano
 Reggie Young – Guitar

Technical personnel
 Lou Bradley – Engineer
 Brad Kanawyer – Design
 Ronnie Milsap – Sleeve notes
 Ed Thrasher – Art direction, photography
 Norro Wilson – Producer
 Bergen White – String arrangement

Charts

Release history

References

1977 albums
Albums produced by Norro Wilson
Margo Smith albums
Warner Records albums